Yi Zhenxing (born 15 July 1984, English name: Show Joy), better known by his online name Jiaoshou Yi Xiaoxing, is a Chinese Internet celebrity, screenwriter and director. He is one of the creators of media film company UniMedia.

In 2013, he directed Great Village Girl (Mandarin Pronunciation 大村姑), winning Best Screenplay in the One Foundation Video Festival and 5th Taipei International Short Film Festival Award for Best Plot.

His stream drama Surprise S1 (2013) and Surprise S2 (2014) achieved great success.

He directed a comedy film in the same name Surprise (2015).

Early life

Career

2012-2013 
February 2012, he had opportunity to direct short film Invisible Girl-friend adapted from hot posts; in July 2012, he participated in a motivational film Great Village Girl (Mandarin Pronunciation 大村姑) as a director, and win China Ceremony Short Film Award for Best Screenwriter and 5th Taipei International Short Film Festival Award for Best Plot; then in the October the same year, he directed a short film Call Me Dad, which tells the interesting story between a daughter and her father who returned home after drifting in Beijing; in December 2012, he also directed a short film Release Wand.

2013-2015 
In 2014, one of his stream dramas Surprise S1 (2013) win the KingBonn Award for Best Series and Best Internet Short Film, and the other stream drama Surprise S2 (2014) achieved total 6 hundred million hits.

In September 2014, he published his book surprise: Life is Comedy.

In 2015, he directed short film Surprise: At a Crucial Moment in February and guested on Moron Brothers 3 in December.

2015-present 
In December 2015, his first film Surprise was released.

In March 2016, he was selected in the top 6 of China's Cyber-celebrity Ranking in 2015.

Filmography

Film (Directed)

Film (Performed)

Television

Work (Produced)

Discography

Singles

References 

1984 births
Living people
Film directors from Hunan
Chinese Internet celebrities
Screenwriters from Hunan
People from Yueyang
Changsha University of Science and Technology alumni